Anjuman Ara Begum (11 January 1942 – 29 May 2004) was a Bangladeshi vocalist. She was awarded Ekushey Padak in 2003 by the Government of Bangladesh.

Background and career
Begum was born on January 11, 1942, in Bogra to Kasiruddin Talukder and Begum Ziaunnahar Talukder. She was the youngest among her two brothers and five sisters. She completed BA (hons) and MA from the department of sociology at the University of Dhaka. She started her career in playback music in 1958. She sang on film, television and stage. Her notable songs include  Tumi Ashbe Boley, Akasher Hatey, Key Swaraner Prantore, Khokonshona, Chadni, Brishti Johon and Shathi Ronger.

Begum rendered one of the first songs telecast on Bangladesh Television in 1964.

Personal life
Begum was married to Masud Alam Siddiqui. Together they had one son Tariq Masrur, and one daughter, Umana Anjalin. Her eldest sisters were Begum Zabunnesa Jamal, a lyricist and educationist and Mahbub Ara, a singer of radio and television. Her niece, Zeenat Rahana, is a vocal artiste and Runa Laila was her cousin sister.

Film songs

Awards
 Ekushey Padak (2003)
 Tarokalok Award
 Gunijan Award from Bangladesh Shilpakala Academy
 Koloddhani Padak

References

1942 births
2004 deaths
People from Bogra District
University of Dhaka alumni
20th-century Bangladeshi women singers
20th-century Bangladeshi singers
Recipients of the Ekushey Padak
Deaths from pneumonia in Bangladesh
Burials at Banani Graveyard